Jefferson Avenue is a  scenic road along the eastern part of the Detroit metropolitan area in the southeastern part of the U.S. state of Michigan. It travels alongside Lake Erie, the Detroit River, and Lake St. Clair. This road also provides access to many recreational facilities in the area. West Jefferson Avenue is primarily commercial, while East Jefferson Avenue contains a historic residential district.

History 
Jefferson is one of five major avenues (along with Woodward, Michigan, Grand River, and Gratiot) planned by Judge Augustus B. Woodward in 1805 that extend from downtown Detroit in differing directions. First surveyed in 1807, it was named Main Street. It was later renamed Jefferson Avenue after U.S. President Thomas Jefferson, who was a friend of Woodward. Jefferson Avenue was planned to extend due east of downtown, parallel to the Detroit River. Later additions to the road have extended it west of downtown as well, where it continues to travel near the waterfront through the Downriver area.

Route description 

This road originates in the City of Detroit.  Jefferson passes under Huntington Place, but such structures as 150 West Jefferson and the UAW-Ford National Programs Center are located upon it as it rises to ground level there.  It then passes through much of eastern Detroit and then the Grosse Pointe communities, St. Clair Shores, and Harrison Township, among others.  It also serves as the backbone of the rich neighborhoods of the Grosse Pointe communities, skirting the eastern portion of Detroit. Westward, Jefferson Avenue passes under Huntington Place, by the former site of Joe Louis Arena, and through southwest Detroit, then it passes through the Downriver communities of River Rouge, Ecorse, Wyandotte, Riverview, Trenton, Gibraltar, and Brownstown Township before crossing the Jefferson Avenue Bridge into Berlin Township in Monroe County, intersecting with roads leading to bridges to Grosse Ile (Grosse Ile Parkway in Trenton leading up to the Wayne County Bridge and Bridge Road in Riverview leading up to the Grosse Ile Toll Bridge).  The Trenton Channel Power Plant and Elizabeth Park are located along Jefferson Avenue in Trenton.

Although the road is continuous with Jefferson Avenue to the north and south, the name changes in Wyandotte to Biddle Avenue; similarly, in Grosse Pointe Farms and Grosse Pointe Shores, the name changes to Lake Shore Drive; the name also changes to U.S. Turnpike Road in Berlin Charter Township after crossing the Jefferson Avenue Bridge.  A gap occurs at the former Selfridge Air Force Base, now a golf course and the Selfridge Air National Guard Base.

Jefferson Avenue's east end is at 23 Mile Road, near the boundary between Chesterfield Township and New Baltimore; the western end is in Berlin Township at the intersection with Dixie Highway and Strong Road.

There are two small gaps in Jefferson Avenue on Detroit's southwest side. The first, one block long between Clark and Scotten Streets, is occupied by the Detroit/Wayne County Port Authority's Detroit Terminal. The second gap is just under two blocks long, from a point east of 23rd Street to 21st Street under the Ambassador Bridge, and was instituted to increase the security of that bridge's Detroit anchorage.

In downtown Detroit, the southern end of M-10 is routed on Jefferson to the corner of Randolph St./M-3. From the corner of Randolph to the southern end of I-375 between Beaubien and St. Antoine streets, Jefferson is the extremely short, 0.015 mile-long, unsigned BS I-375.

Images

See also
 
 
 Transportation in metropolitan Detroit
 East Jefferson Avenue Residential District

References

External links
 

Streets in Michigan
Culture of Detroit
Detroit River
Transportation in Wayne County, Michigan
Transportation in Detroit